= Dorimond =

French actor and playwright

Dorimond (sometime spelt Dorimont or Dorimon), real name Nicolas Drouin (1628–1693), was a 17th-century French comedian and playwright, who was born and died in Paris. In the early 1660s, he published some plays that have influenced (or were influenced by) Molière, which is the main reason why his name is not forgotten.

== Works ==
- 1655: L'Apologie du théâtre, Rouen
- 1658: Le Festin de pierre ou le Fils criminel
- 1659: La Précaution inutile ou l'École des cocus
- 1659: L'Inconstance punie
- 1660: L'Amant de sa femme
- 1661: La Femme industrieuse
- 1661: La Rosélie
